Sebastian Kneipp is a 1958 Austrian historical film directed by Wolfgang Liebeneiner and starring Carl Wery, Paul Hörbiger, and Gerlinde Locker. It is also sometimes known as Wasserdoktor. The film is a biopic of the Bavarian Sebastian Kneipp, one of the pioneers of naturopathic medicine.

It was made partly at the Salzburg Studios and shot in Agfacolor. The film's sets were designed by the art director Wolf Witzemann. Location shooting took place in the spa town Bad Wörishofen in Bavaria.

Cast
 Carl Wery as Sebastian Kneipp
 Paul Hörbiger as  Archduke Joseph
 Gerlinde Locker as Aglaya
 Michael Cramer as Hans von Faber
 Ellinor Jensen as Sebastiana
 Anita Gutwell as Anna
 Ernst Deutsch as Pope Leo XIII
 Hans Thimig as The Cardinal
 Egon von Jordan as Fr. Hoferer
 Heinz Moog as Prof. v. Ziemssen
 Horst Beck as Dr. Schmidt
 Willi Hufnagel as Semmelbauer
 Peter Lühr as 	Bischof Pankratius
 Felix Czerny as Kammerdiener Ledl
 Paul Klinger as Dr. Baumgarten
 Alfred Cerny as Heini
 Otto Bolesch as Herr Beda
 Norbert Scharnagel as Amtsrichter
 Vera Complojer as Patient of Kneipp
 Willy Schäfer as Vittorio

References

Bibliography
 Bock, Hans-Michael & Bergfelder, Tim. The Concise CineGraph. Encyclopedia of German Cinema. Berghahn Books, 2009.
 Strasser, Christian. The Sound of Klein-Hollywood: Filmproduktion in Salzburg, Salzburg im Film : mit einem Filmlexikon. Österreichischer Kunst- und Kulturverlag, 1993.

External links

1958 films
1950s biographical films
Austrian biographical films
Austrian historical films
1950s historical films
1950s German-language films
Films directed by Wolfgang Liebeneiner
Films set in the 19th century
Films set in Bavaria
Films shot in Bavaria